Pierre Bernard-Reymond (born 16 January 1944 in Gap, Hautes-Alpes) was a member of the Senate of France, representing the Hautes-Alpes department as a member of the Union for a Popular Movement.

References
Page on the Senate website

1944 births
Living people
People from Gap, Hautes-Alpes
Centre Democracy and Progress politicians
Centre of Social Democrats politicians
Union for French Democracy politicians
Union for a Popular Movement politicians
French Senators of the Fifth Republic
Politicians from Provence-Alpes-Côte d'Azur
Senators of Hautes-Alpes